Stanisław Urban (13 September 1907 – April 1940) was a Polish rower who competed in the 1928 Summer Olympics and in the 1932 Summer Olympics.

In 1928 he was part of the Polish boat which finished fourth in the eight event after being eliminated in the quarter-finals. Four years later he won the bronze medal as member of the Polish boat in the coxed four competition.

He was a reserve lieutenant in the Polish Army and participated in the Polish defensive war in September 1939. Arrested by the Soviets he was murdered in the Katyn massacre.

References

External links
 profile

1907 births
1940 deaths
Rowers from Warsaw
People from Warsaw Governorate
20th-century Polish people
Polish male rowers
Olympic rowers of Poland
Rowers at the 1928 Summer Olympics
Rowers at the 1932 Summer Olympics
Olympic bronze medalists for Poland
Polish military personnel killed in World War II
Katyn massacre victims
Olympic medalists in rowing
Executed people from Masovian Voivodeship
Medalists at the 1932 Summer Olympics
Polish Army officers